Hagoromo may refer to:
 hagoromo (羽衣), feathered kimono of tennin, spiritual beings found in Japanese Buddhism
 Hagoromo Fulltouch Chalk, a Japanese brand of blackboard chalk originally produced by Hagoromo Bungu
 Hagoromo Gitsune, one of the main antagonists in Nura: Rise of the Yokai Clan
 Hagoromo, a small space orbiter released by the Japanese spacecraft Hiten
 Hagoromo (play), a Japanese Noh play
 Hagoromo Club, a former football club based in Shimizu-ku, Shizuoka
 Hagoromo International University, a private university in Osaka
 Hagoromo Gakuen Junior College, a former junior college
 Hagoromo Station, a railway station in Osaka Prefecture